Buddy Longway is a western comic book written by the Swiss comic book writer Derib. It is published under the Le Lombard publishing house. The first issue came out in 1972, and 16 issues were published until 1987. Derib restarted the series in 2002, continuing with four further issues until 2006, when he announced that the 20th issue, La Source, would be the last.

Both the story arcs and the drawings are praised for the realistic portrayal of the simplistic, rough life as a trapper.

Overview
The series is a family saga which centers around the eponymous character Buddy Longway, a trapper who lives in the wilderness. He lives married to a Sioux Native American woman called Chinook. In the course of the series, they have two children, Jeremy and Kathleen.

Main topics of the series, which is set in the 19th century, are living in the wilderness, interracial relationships, Native American culture, coming of age (Jeremy and Kathleen) and age (Buddy Longway).

Background
Longway is described as a brooding, vulnerable character who visibly ages during the course of the series. Derib commented: "I am someone very emotional and I believe to know how to transfer this dimension into a comic book." Derib deliberately chose this slant, which was unusual compared to contemporary Western comics like Lucky Luke or Blueberry: "I wanted to renew the narrative modes in comics, especially the notion that a hero should be perfect, invincible or immortal (e.g. Lucky Luke or Blueberry), so my idea was to write about a simple man."

Derib said he was extremely fond of Longway, so much that he almost regarded him like a son.

References

External links
Official website 

Buddy Longway
Western (genre) comics characters
Comics characters introduced in 1972
Buddy Longway
Buddy Longway